Rick Gunn (born March 5, 1958) is an American politician who has served in the North Carolina Senate from the 24th district since 2011.

References

External links

|-

1958 births
Living people
Republican Party North Carolina state senators